Facing the Music may refer to:

 Facing the Music (1933 film), a British musical
 Facing the Music (1941 film), a British comedy
 Facing the Music (2001 film), an Australian documentary
 Facing the Music, a 1973 autobiography by Henri Temianka
 Facing the Music, a 1988 short-story collection by Larry Brown
 Facing the Music, a 2014 memoir by Jennifer Knapp

See also 

 
 Face the Music (disambiguation)